Norman Sykes  (17 May 1897– 20 March 1961) was a priest in Anglican orders and a distinguished ecclesiastical historian, sometime Professor of History, Westfield College, London, sometime Fellow of The Queen's College, Oxford and Dixie Professor of Ecclesiastical History at the University of Cambridge (1944).

He was a Fellow of Emmanuel College, Cambridge from 1944 to 1958 and an Honorary Fellow from 1958 to 1961.

He was Dean of Winchester from 1958 to 1961, dying while in office.

A principal contention of his studies was to engage a more positive re-evaluation of the eighteenth century Church of England.

His effective use of archives was demonstrated with the papers of William Wake held at Christ Church, Oxford prior to publication of his two-volume work devoted to that archbishop.

Works include

William Wake, Archbishop of Canterbury 1657-1757, 2 vols., Cambridge 1957 
From Sheldon to Secker, Aspects of English Church History 1660-1757 (based on Ford Lectures given at Oxford 1958), Cambridge 1959, 2004
Old Priest and New Presbyter: The Anglican attitude to episcopacy, presbyterianism and papacy since the Reformation, Cambridge 1956
Church and State in the XVIIIth Century (expanded from Birkbeck Lectures 1931-1933], Cambridge 1934, 1962
Man as Churchman (based on lectures given at Belfast 1959), New York, Cambridge 1960

References

British theologians
20th-century English Anglican priests
Fellows of the British Academy
Fellows of Emmanuel College, Cambridge
Deans of Winchester
1897 births
1961 deaths
Dixie Professors of Ecclesiastical History